Clyde R. Taylor (born 1931) is an American writer and film scholar, who is an emeritus professor at New York University. His scholarship and commentary often focuses on black film.

Career
Taylor is a contributor to journals such as Black Film Review and Jump Cut. He coined the term 'L.A. Rebellion' for the Los Angeles School of Black Filmmakers movement. He wrote the documentary film, Midnight Ramble, and is the author of The Mask of Art: Breaking the Aesthetic Contract – Film and Literature (Indiana University Press, 1998).

References

Living people
African-American non-fiction writers
American non-fiction writers
African-American academics
New York University faculty
African-American screenwriters
Screenwriters from New York (state)
L.A. Rebellion
1968 births
20th-century African-American people
21st-century African-American people